Lee Hyung-taik was the defending champion, but he retired from playing tournaments before this event.
Takao Suzuki won in the final 6–4, 7–6(5), against Martin Fischer.

Seeds

Draw

Finals

Top half

Bottom half

References
 Main Draw
 Qualifying Draw

2009 ATP Challenger Tour
Singles